Anna Ulrika Lindberg (born 16 November 1981) is a Swedish former diver. She won the 1m and 3m Springboard events at the 2006 European Aquatics Championships and the 2012 European Aquatics Championships. She is the daughter of former Swedish divers Ulrika Knape and Mathz Lindberg.

Lindberg competed in five Olympic Summer Games, in 1996, 2000, 2004, 2008 and 2012. Her best result was a 5th place on the 3m springboard in 2000.

In 2022, she participated in the second season of Masked Singer Sweden, broadcast on TV4.

She gave birth to a son, Yelverton, on 30 May 2009. The father is the Swedish hockey player Calle Steen.

References

External links
 The Swedish Olympic Committee

Swedish female divers
Olympic divers of Sweden
Divers at the 1996 Summer Olympics
Divers at the 2000 Summer Olympics
Divers at the 2004 Summer Olympics
Divers at the 2008 Summer Olympics
Divers at the 2012 Summer Olympics
1981 births
Living people
People from Karlskoga Municipality
Sportspeople from Örebro County